Lázně Toušeň (formerly Toušeň) is a spa market town in Prague-East District in the Central Bohemian Region of the Czech Republic. It has about 1,400 inhabitants.

Geography
It lies in a flat agricultural landscape in the Central Elbe Table within the Polabí lowland. The market town is situated on the left bank of the Elbe River, opposite the confluence of the Elbe and Jizera rivers. In the western part of the municipal territory are two artificial lakes created by flooding sandstone quarries: Mezi mosty and Malvíny.

History
The first written mention of Toušeň is from 1293. In the 17th century, it was owned by the Waldstein family. In 1777, part of the market town's land was separated and the new village of Káraný was founded on it. The iron spring has been known since time immemorial and in 1868, a small spa was founded. After the World War II, the spa focused on the treatment of top athletes.

Economy
Lázně Toušeň is known for its mud baths. The original spa was expanded with mud baths in 1899. the spa focuses on the treatment of musculoskeletal, skin, nervous system and gynecological diseases. Peloid is used for the mud baths.

Sights
The landmark of Lázně Toušeň is the Church of Saint Florian. It was buiult in the neo-Gothic style in 1888–1889.

References

External links

Market towns in the Czech Republic
Spa towns in the Czech Republic